Ahmet Piriştina (8 April 1952 – 15 June 2004) was a  Turkish politician who was Mayor of İzmir from 1999 to 2004. He was of Albanian descent.

Piriştina was born in İzmir, Turkey. He was elected as Mayor of İzmir in two consecutive elections, in 1999 and 2004. As mayor he became known in Izmir for keeping his electoral promises and being an honest politician. He died of a heart attack at the age of 52. Mayor Piriştina's image was draped by Izmir residents over buildings, monuments, boats and buses, while over a million people attended his funeral.

Political life

During his terms of office he launched many projects to resolve the structural problems of İzmir and protect İzmir's natural resources and cultural heritage. Some examples of his achievements are:

 İzmir Port Area Urban Design International Ideas Competition: The aim of this competition was to encourage new ideas for the development of urban areas and the architectural character of the İzmir port area, and, following this competition, construct a new city centre in the port area of an international repute.
 Channel Project: The aim of this project was to collect the domestic and industrial waste water throughout İzmir and, after purification, to discharge them to the Gulf of İzmir, the biggest natural gulf of Turkey. This project resulted in a reduction in the pollution levels of the Gulf.
 Parks and gardens: Mr Piriştina created  of open spaces. He also grassed over street refuges and viaducts and not only doubled the area of open spaces but also improved their appearance.
 Metro Project: He constructed the İzmir Metro to reduce traffic congestion. With its high technology and coordination, the İzmir Metro System became an important model for many developed countries.
 Car Park Project: Rapid immigration resulted in a spate of unplanned and chaotic construction, accompanied by a decline in open spaces and car parking lots. Such a one process, local administrations experience difficulties in finding corresponding places for increasing access needs, and come across with high costs. Despite these problems, the İzmir Metropolitan Government created new areas to meet the requirements for car parking.
 The Project of Protecting Water Sources: While providing a reliable water supply to İzmir, he was setting workers to resolve firmly to protect existent water sources for ensuring high quality and healthy water to İzmir. Besides of these, Piriştina entrenched and safeguarded the dam of Tahtalı and its basin. Tahtalı barrage is important for İzmir because it makes up the shortage in water supply to the city.
 Parent House of İzmir: Among the buildings constructed during the period of İzmir’s Republic, Fire Department Building had a privilege. Because of this concession, Mr. Piriştina restored this building and made it Parent House of İzmir.
 Museums in İzmir: Ahmet Piriştina constructed a culture park for historical artifacts (stone, ceramic and precious works of art). This museum contains many precious works covering several civilisations.

References

External links
 Who is who database - Biography of Ahmet Piriştina

1952 births
2004 deaths
People from İzmir
Turkish people of Albanian descent
Mayors of İzmir
Republican People's Party (Turkey) politicians
Members of the 20th Parliament of Turkey